Nii Nortey Ashong (born November 17, 1994, in Accra) is a Ghanaian professional footballer who plays as a WW for Sliema Wanderers in the Maltese Premier League.

Career
Ashong made his Coppa Italia debut for Fiorentina on November 24, 2011, in a match against Empoli.
On 30 May 2012 Fiorentina pay 300.000 euro for the other part of the co-ownership by Triestina.

On 10 July 2013, Ashong completed a one-year loan transfer to Spezia.

At the end of season he moves to Latina.

Career statistics

References

External links

1994 births
Living people
Footballers from Accra
Ghanaian footballers
Ghanaian expatriate footballers
Expatriate footballers in Italy
Serie B players
ACF Fiorentina players
Spezia Calcio players
Latina Calcio 1932 players
Matera Calcio players
S.S.D. Lucchese 1905 players
Maltese Premier League players
Association football defenders
Expatriate footballers in Malta
Sliema Wanderers F.C. players
Ghanaian expatriate sportspeople in Malta